George Bailey is the name of:

People
George Bailey (athlete) (1906–2000), English steeplechase runner
George Bailey (cricketer, born 1982), Australian cricketer
George Bailey (cricketer, born 1853) (1853–1926), Australian cricketer
George Bailey (cricketer, born 1882) (1882–1964), Australian cricketer
George Bailey (footballer) (1919–1998), Australian rules footballer for Carlton and Perth
George Bailey (gymnast), British Olympic gymnast
George Bailey (journalist) (1919–2001), American journalist/writer
George Bailey (racing driver) (1900–1940), American racecar driver
George E. Bailey (1859–1900), American murder victim
George Edwin Bailey (1879–1965), British electrical engineer and industrialist
George Bailey Loring (1817–1891), American politician
George Bailey Sansom (1883–1965), English historian of ancient Japan
George W. Bailey Jr. (1833–1865), Vermont attorney and public official
G. W. Bailey (George William Bailey, born 1944), American actor
Clifton George Bailey III, known as Capleton (born 1967), Jamaican reggae artist
George Bailey, candidate in the 2010 United States House of Representatives elections in Mississippi

Characters
George Bailey (It's a Wonderful Life)